The Keohane North American Swiss Teams bridge championship is held at the fall American Contract Bridge League (ACBL) North American Bridge Championship (NABC).

The Keohane North American Swiss Teams is a six session Swiss Teams event, two qualifying sessions, two semi-final sessions and two final sessions that takes place over three days.
The event typically starts on the second Friday of the NABC.
The event is open.

History
The event was introduced in 1977.
The trophy was donated by Ethel Keohane in memory of her husband, William H. Keohane (1896–1972).

The Keohane Trophy was presented for the Open Individual Championship until it was re-designated in 1995 by the ACBL Board of Directors for the North American Swiss Teams.

Winners

Sources

List of previous winners, Page 7

2008 winners, Page 1

External links
ACBL official website
ACBL NABC Winners - Keohane North American Swiss teams

North American Bridge Championships